Logan Edward Cooke (born July 28, 1995) is an American football punter for the Jacksonville Jaguars of the National Football League (NFL). He played college football at Mississippi State.  He has been the regular Jaguars punter since the 2018 draft.

Early years
Cooke attended and played high school football at Columbia Academy. He received offers from Southern Miss and Mississippi State before ultimately choosing to attended Mississippi State.

College career
Cooke played for Mississippi State from 2014–2017. He recorded 150 punts for 6,250 net yards for a 41.7 average.

Collegiate statistics

Professional career
Cooke was drafted by the Jacksonville Jaguars in the seventh round (247th overall) in the 2018 NFL Draft. He made his NFL debut in the Jaguars' season opener against the New York Giants. In the 20–15 victory, he had seven punts for 264 net yards. Overall, he finished his rookie season with 86 punts for 3,872 net yards for a 45.02 average.

Cooke was placed on the reserve/COVID-19 list by the Jaguars on December 21, 2020, and activated on December 31.

On March 20, 2021, Cooke signed a four-year, $12 million contract extension with the Jaguars.

See also
List of National Football League career punting yards leaders

References

External links
Jacksonville Jaguars bio
Mississippi State Bulldogs bio

1995 births
Living people
People from Columbia, Mississippi
Players of American football from Mississippi
American football punters
Mississippi State Bulldogs football players
Jacksonville Jaguars players